Ernest William Greeves (22 April 1873 – 24 June 1946) was an Australian rules footballer who played with St Kilda in the Victorian Football League (VFL).
He was born in Woodend, Victoria.

References

External links 

1873 births
1946 deaths
Australian rules footballers from Victoria (Australia)
St Kilda Football Club players